Clarence Munyai (born 20 February 1998) is a South African sprinter. He is the current South African record holder in the 200 metres, with a time of 19.69, set on 16 March 2018 at the South African national championships. He is ranked 10th in the world for 200 metres and 12th for the 300 metres. He competed in the men's 200 metres at the 2016 Summer Olympics. He finished 3rd in his heat with a time of 20.66 seconds and did not qualify for the semifinals.

He competed in the men's 200 metres and the men's 4 x 100 metres relay at the 2020 Summer Olympics.

Statistics

Personal bests

Season's bests

International competitions

Qualified for the final, but did not start.

National titles
South African Championships
200 metres: 2016
South African U23/U20/U18/U16 Championships
200 metres: 2016

References

External links

1998 births
Living people
South African male sprinters
Olympic athletes of South Africa
Athletes (track and field) at the 2016 Summer Olympics
Sportspeople from Johannesburg
World Athletics Championships athletes for South Africa
Athletes (track and field) at the 2018 Commonwealth Games
Commonwealth Games competitors for South Africa
Athletes (track and field) at the 2020 Summer Olympics
20th-century South African people
21st-century South African people